Sukhdeep Singh, better known by his stage name Sukh-E  or Sukh-E Muzical Doctorz, is an Indian singer-songwriter and music producer associated with Punjabi and Hindi-language songs. He debuted his first single "Sniper" featuring Raftaar. His 2015 single "Jaguar" featuring Bohemia was written by lyricist Jaani.

Early life and career 
Sukhdeep hails from Garhshankar, Punjab, India. He went to Chandigarh for higher studies and after his graduation, he founded a band Muzical Doctorz.

He split with Preet Hundal but continued on with the name Muzical Doctorz, under which he signed new singers and rappers.  "All through my college life, I had a great inclination towards music. I used to participate in various music competitions and perform in college fests. I had full support from my friends and girlfriend and that gave me the confidence to build a niche for ‘Muzical Doctorz’. I enjoyed my college life in proper ‘punjabi-style’ and that fun is reflected through my songs." said Sukh-E.

He debuted with song Sniper feat. Raftaar, Sukh-e gained popularity by releasing the single "Jaguar" with Bohemia. He again collaborated on another single "All Black" with Raftaar. He is also working with Jaani and Avvy Sra. Recently Sukh-E featured in a song named 'Club Pub' with Ali Quli Mirza and Bohemia. His latest release is a song named FOCUS. Sukhe released his first track with desi melodies named Coka in January 2019.

Discography

See also
 Indian rap music

References

External links 
 
 

Indian rappers
Indian male singer-songwriters
Indian singer-songwriters
Living people
Singers from Punjab, India
People from Hoshiarpur district
Punjabi-language singers
Year of birth missing (living people)